Mordellistena bicinctella is a beetle in the genus Mordellistena of the family Mordellidae. It was described in 1862 by John Lawrence LeConte. It is found in the Ontario Peninsula, the central United States, and Texas.

References

bicinctella
Beetles described in 1862